"Free bench" is a legal term referring to an ancient manorial custom in parts of England whereby a widow, until she remarried, could retain tenure of her late husband's land.

"Free Bench (Lat. francus bancus). The widow's right to a copyhold. It is not a dower or gift, but a free right independent of the will of the husband. Called bench because, upon acceding to the estate, she becomes a tenant of the manor, and one of the benchers, i.e. persons who sit on the bench occupied by the pares curiæ (Peers of Court)".

The widow of a tenant was usually allowed her free bench, so long as she preserved her chastity. But if any evidence appeared against her, or she declared an intention of remarrying, she had to forfeit her lands.

The rights to free bench varied from manor to manor and were subject to local custom. Some did not have the custom at all.

In a few cases, some very unusual ways of circumventing the problem have been recorded. For instance, the widow submitted to the penalty of riding into court upon a black ram holding its tail in her hand and repeating the following lines of nonsense (as recorded in No. 614 of The Spectator):
"Here I am,
Riding upon a black ram,
Like a whore as I am;
And for my crincum crancum (wicked conduct)
Have lost my bincum bancum, (widows land)
And for my tail's game
Have done this worldly shame;
Therefore I pray you, Mr Steward,
Let me have my land again."

Legrewite
A similar practice to freebench sometimes applied to the children, who had to follow the conditions of their father. The lord had to look narrowly after the morals and marriages of the daughters of his farmers. A case of female incontinence was punished by a fine called  'Legrewite'  or  'Leyr-wite'  [From leyr derives 'lair'. l< OE leger= lying (down), a bed + wite = a fine], and the birth of an illegitimate child was followed by another called  'childwite' , which in one of the manors of Bury Monastery was fixed at 2s. 8d.: it was due from the guardian, who might be the father or the brother, of the unfortunate damsel. In some cases the young woman went through a grotesque act of penance. At Faringdon, a tenant's daughter, on being convicted of incontinence, forfeited forty pence (no small sum) in the reign of Henry III, to the lord of the manor; which was only remitted on condition of the offender's appearing in the lord's court, carrying a black sheep on her back, and making confession of her shame.

Manors where this custom is recorded
Chaddleworth, Berkshire.
Enborne, Berkshire
Talskiddy, Cornwall.
Cardinham, Cornwall.
Torre, Devon.
Kilmersdon, Somerset

See also
 Manorialism
 Manor house
 Feudalism

References

Richard Carew's Survey of Cornwall.

External links

http://www.exclassics.com/newgate/ng281.htm
https://web.archive.org/web/20061126172700/http://www.btinternet.com/~coppinhomepage/
Berkshire History

Feudalism in England
English legal terminology
English law